In Search of... is an American television series that was broadcast weekly from 1977 to 1982, devoted to mysterious phenomena. It was created after the success of three one-hour TV documentaries produced by creator Alan Landsburg: In Search of Ancient Astronauts in 1973 (based on the book Chariots of the Gods? by Erich von Däniken), In Search of Ancient Mysteries and The Outer Space Connection, both in 1975 (later adapted into popular paperbacks written by Landsburg), all of which featured narration by Rod Serling, who was the initial choice to host the spin-off show. Serling died before production started, and Leonard Nimoy was then selected to be the host. The series was revived with host Mitch Pileggi in 2002 and again in 2018 with Zachary Quinto, currently airing on the History Channel.

The original series was shown in Australia in the 1980s under the title Great Mysteries of the World with each episode having an introduction and conclusion presented by television presenter Scott Lambert.

Format 

The program conducted investigations into the controversial and paranormal (e.g., UFOs, Bigfoot, and the Loch Ness Monster). Additionally, it featured episodes about mysterious historical events and personalities such as Anna Anderson/Grand Duchess Anastasia, the Lincoln Assassination, the Jack the Ripper murders, infamous cults (e.g., Jim Jones), and missing persons, cities, and ships (e.g., Amelia Earhart, Jimmy Hoffa, D. B. Cooper, the Mary Celeste, the Titanic, the lost Roanoke Colony). Because the show often presented offbeat subjects and controversial theories, each episode's opening credits included a verbal disclaimer about the conjectural nature of the evidence and theories to be presented:

The production values were fairly typical of the period, with interviews, reenactments and scenic footage shot on film, all voiced over by Nimoy. The music was composed by Laurin M. Rinder and W. Michael Lewis. A soundtrack album was released on AVI (American Variety International) Records in 1977.

Nimoy's popularity among science fiction fans (due to his role as Spock in the original Star Trek television series) won the show a following in fandom circles. Nimoy wrote an episode about the turbulent life of artist Vincent van Gogh, having earlier played the artist's brother Theo in a one-man show. As part of his research, Nimoy found records in the archives of the hospital where Van Gogh was treated that suggested that he suffered from epilepsy rather than insanity.

The show also spawned at least six spin-off books, all written by Landsburg with forewords by Nimoy: In Search of Lost Civilizations, In Search of Extraterrestrials, In Search of Magic and Witchcraft, In Search of Strange Phenomena, In Search of Missing Persons, and In Search of Myths and Monsters, with an additional book that collected the best segments from these existing volumes.

In 1978, Landsburg produced a Bigfoot documentary using portions of two In Search of... episodes ("The Monster Hunters" and "The Yeti") called Manbeast! Myth or Monster, based on his book In Search of Myths and Monsters. Though Nimoy had written the foreword to Landsburg's book, he did not narrate this documentary.

Reruns of the In Search of... series aired during the early 1990s on the A&E Network. In the later 1990s, the show aired on another of the A&E Television Networks' properties, the History Channel. The licensing agreement expired in the early 2000s, ending the show's run. When the show aired on A&E, a re-recording of the original theme music was used plus a new alternate theme. The original opening titles were also modernized. In this incarnation virtually all of Nimoy's on-camera appearances in the series were replaced with reused footage, so viewers could hear Nimoy but not see him.

A short-lived revival of the show, featuring Mitch Pileggi, aired on the Sci-Fi Channel in 2002.

In January 2018, it was announced that Zachary Quinto, who, like Nimoy, stars as Spock in the rebooted Star Trek films, would host the revived version of the show on History Channel. On March 27, 2019, History Channel announced the series was renewed for a second season.

Episodes 

The original series ran for six seasons.

Specials

Season 1 (1977)

Season 2 (1977–1978)

Season 3 (1978–1979)

Season 4 (1979–1980)

Season 5 (1980–1981)

Season 6 (1981–1982)

Mitch Pileggi revival (2002)

History Channel revival (2018)

Home media releases 
In February 2012, it was announced that Visual Entertainment, under license from Universal Studios, had acquired the home video rights to the original series for the United States and Canada. In Search of: The Complete Collection was released in Canada and the U.S. on December 11, 2012, from VEI's website.

The 21-DVD set includes all 144 installments hosted by Leonard Nimoy. Also included are two Rod Serling specials: In Search of Ancient Astronauts and In Search of Ancient Mysteries which aired prior to the start of the regular Nimoy series. The three Landsburg specials, The Outer Space Connection, Secrets of the Bermuda Triangle and Manbeast! Myth or Monster, are not included. VEI also included all eight episodes of the short-lived 2002 series hosted by Mitch Pileggi.

Homages 
The style of the original In Search of... has been paid homage to and parodied by many productions. Examples include Mysteries in History, a show-within-a-show that plays a part in the plotline to Men in Black II (the faux series is hosted by Peter Graves in the film; coincidentally, Graves once co-starred with Nimoy in Mission: Impossible). Two other examples are Truth from Legend and Fact from Myth, two nearly identical series existing in alternate universes for which "mini-episodes" were created for YouTube as part of the viral marketing campaign for the two-part video game BioShock Infinite: Burial at Sea.

See also 
Other series using a similar title:
 In Search of the Dark Ages
 In Search of the Trojan War
 In Search of Aliens

References

External links 

 

History (American TV channel) original programming
1976 American television series debuts
1982 American television series endings
2002 American television series debuts
2002 American television series endings
2018 American television series debuts
2019 American television series endings
First-run syndicated television programs in the United States
A&E (TV network) original programming
Syfy original programming
Television series by Universal Television
Television series by Fremantle (company)
Paranormal television
UFO-related television
Pseudoarchaeology
Pseudohistory
English-language television shows
American television series revived after cancellation
Television series by Alan Landsburg Productions